Matthew John Griswold (born August 29, 1982 in Austin, Minnesota) is an American Folk singer, songwriter and musician who has recorded and released a catalog of albums and singles independently. He also writes and records both songs and scores for film and television, under a publishing/licensing deal with Universal Publishing's production music arm. He is currently based (as of 2015) in Minneapolis, where he remains a working songwriter and an active touring performer around the US.

He first made a regional and national name for himself by touring as a working musician, being a voice for Veteran's Recovery, and an Alternative Folk recording artist.

Background
Griswold served five years in the active military as an enlisted member of the U.S. Army, where he was a Military Police soldier and member of the 2nd Brigade Combat Team/First Armored Division (based in Baumholder, Germany). He was deployed to Iraq with his unit to fight in the Battle Of Ramadi(2006). Griswold has been recognized for his work in bringing awareness and being an advocate for "Recovery and Transition" issues concerning and affecting today's veterans. He has been a guest speaker and advisor to a number of schools, VA medical centers, organizations, and regional and national conventions, where he provides his insights on the issues of recovery for veterans.

Griswold has had a notable number of songs licensed for production media synchronization after signing his catalog over to the Universal Music Publishing company, APM Music and Universal Publishing Production Music. His music has been used in such Films as “Old Man & the Gun”, “The New Environmentalist”, “High School Confidential”, and Television productions such as “Expedition Unknown”, NBC's “The Today Show”, BBC's “Copper”(Season 2) and Purina's “Just Right” commercial. His scores have been used by BBC's Earth, Food Network, The Discovery Channel, PGA Tour, NFL, Sport Fishing TV, Animal Planet, Outdoor Magazine, Canadian Global News, and similar networks in over 30 countries.

Discography

Albums And EPs
 "Screaming From The Witch's Tower" 2010
 "East Suburban Serenade Revival" 2012
 "Travelin' to the Grave" 2014
 "Taken to Sacred Ground[EP]" 2015
 "Lakeside EP (Vol 1)" 2017
 "Lakeside EP (Vol 2)" 2017
 "Land of Our Last Chance" 2019
 "Matthew Griswold" 2019

Singles
 "With Healing Hands (Upon your heart)" 2010
 "The Fall” 2012
 "Knockin' On Heaven's Door" 2013
 “Till It’s Gone” 2014

References

External links
 http://www.matthewgriswold.net

1982 births
Living people
American folk singers
American rock singers
American male singer-songwriters
American rock songwriters
Singer-songwriters from Minnesota
21st-century American singers
21st-century American male singers